The Douwe Aukes class (also known as the Van Meerlant class and the Aukes class) were two minelayers of the Royal Netherlands Navy. The two ships were built at the Gusto shipyard in Schiedam. Construction began in 1919 and was completed in 1922. Both vessels were transferred to the British Royal Navy. Van Meerlant was sunk by a mine in 1942 while in British service. Douwe Aukes was returned to the Royal Netherlands Navy following the war and was used as a depot ship until sold for scrap in 1962.

Description
The Douwe Aukes class was an improved version of the preceding s. The minelayers were powered by steam from two Yarrow boilers to two vertical triple expansion engines each turning a shaft. The Douwe Aukes class had a complement of 60 officers and ratings.

Both vessels were initially armed with three single-mounted /40 calibre semi-automatic guns and two single-mounted  anti-aircraft (AA) machine guns. They carried 60 naval mines. Though they were larger than the Hydra class, they carried ten less mines. In British service, Douwe Aukes was converted to a convoy escort and re-armed with one 75 mm gun AA gun, two single-mounted 2-pounder guns and two  cannon.

Ships in class

Construction and career
Following the end of World War I, the Dutch government created a commission to give recommendations about the future of naval planning in light of developments during the war and in the treaties that followed. The commission recommended that in the Netherlands coastal waters, Royal Netherlands Navy priority was to be given to defend approaches to river mouths as the mostly like source of attack was by land. In response to that recommendation, Van Merleent launched in 1920 and completed in 1922. Douwe Aukes was launched and completed that same year.

With the German invasion of the Netherlands in 1940, and the defeat of the nation, Douwe Aukes and Van Merleent both sailed for the United Kingdom in May. Van Merleent was transferred to British Royal Navy service on 14 March 1941. Douwe Aukes was converted to a convoy escort leader and transferred to Royal Navy service on 29 April 1941. Van Merleent did not survive much longer when on 4 June 1941, the vessel was mined and sunk in the Thames River estuary. Douwe Aukes survived the war and was returned to the Royal Netherlands Navy in 1945. In 1948, the vessel was converted to a depot ship and remained as such until scrapped in 1962.

Notes

Citations

Sources

External links

 netherlandsnavy.nl : Douwe Aukes-class minelayers 

Mine warfare vessel classes